"Peace" is a composition by Horace Silver that was first recorded on August 29, 1959. It has become a jazz standard. Silver also wrote lyrics for the tune.

Composition
According to Silver, "I was doodlin' around on the piano, and it just came to me, but I also had the impression that there was an angel standing over me, impressing my mind with this beautiful melody and harmony." Unusually for popular Silver compositions, "Peace" is a slow ballad. It has a ten-bar structure. Ted Gioia observed that "You won't find a single catchy melodic motif here, no surprising interlude, no harmonic shift that takes the piece in an unexpected direction. Instead the soloist cycles through a series of gentle resolving chords, mostly following a familiar ii-V formula, before settling unobtrusively into the tonic key of B flat."

Recordings
The piece was first recorded on August 29, 1959, by the Horace Silver Quintet consisting of Silver (piano), Junior Cook (tenor saxophone), Blue Mitchell (trumpet), Gene Taylor (bass), and Louis Hayes (drums). It was released on the Blue Note album Blowin' the Blues Away.

"Peace has regularly attracted younger musicians". Silver recorded a version with vocals by Andy Bey on That Healin' Feelin' a decade after the original recording.

Bibliography

References

1950s jazz standards
1959 songs
Compositions by Horace Silver